John Lomas may refer to:

 John Lomas (trade unionist) (1848–1933), New Zealand coalminer, trade unionist and public servant
 John Lomas (cricketer) (1917–1945), English cricketer
 John Lomas (RAF officer) (1920–2019), RAF intelligence officer 
 John Lomas (bishop) (born 1958), Bishop of Swansea and Brecon
 John Lomas (martyr), one of the Canterbury Martyrs